Northern Germany is a linguistic, geographic, socio-cultural and historic region in the northern part of Germany which includes the coastal states of Schleswig-Holstein, Mecklenburg-Vorpommern and Lower Saxony and the two city-states Hamburg and Bremen. It contrasts with Southern Germany, Western Germany and Eastern Germany.

Language

Northern Germany generally refers to the Sprachraum area north of the Uerdingen and Benrath line isoglosses, where Low German dialects are spoken. These comprise the Low Saxon dialects in the west (including the Westphalian language area up to the Rhineland), the East Low German region along the Baltic coast with Western Pomerania, the Altmark and northern Brandenburg, as well as the North Low German dialects.

Although from the 19th century onwards, the use of Standard German was strongly promoted especially by the Prussian administration, Low German dialects are still present in rural areas, with an estimated number of five to eight million active speakers. However, since World War II and the immigration of expellees from the former eastern territories of Germany, its prevalence has steadily reduced. Besides which, Frisian is spoken in East and North Frisia, as well as Danish (Standard and South Jutlandic) in parts of Schleswig. From a linguistic and cultural perspective, Northern Germany is linked to the Netherlands, Scandinavia and England. For example, the German word for butcher is Fleischer or Metzger in the middle, east or south of Germany but is called a Schlachter in Northern Germany, resembling the Scandinavian terms for butcher, slagter/slakter. Other examples are the word for potato, which has historically been Erdapfel in much of Southern Germany, Austria and Switzerland, but Kartoffel in Northern Germany and in Danish; the North German verb kieken (meaning to look), resembling the Danish kikke/kigge, or Norwegian kikke (to look); or the word for the fruit orange, which is Orange in standard German, but Apfelsine in Northern Germany, similarly to the Dutch (appelsien/Sinaasappel), Frisian (aapelsiin) and Scandinavian languages (appelsin/apelsin). Additionally, Jansen/Janssen, Hansen, and Petersen are the most common surnames in the far north of Germany (Lower Saxony and Schleswig-Holstein), which are also some of the most common surnames in Denmark (albeit with Jensen for Jansen). Hansen is the single most common surname in Norway, the third most common surname in Denmark, and the third and fifth most common surname in the North German federal states of Schleswig-Holstein and Hamburg, respectively.

Geography
The key terrain feature of Northern Germany is the North German Plain including the marshes along the coastline of the North and Baltic Seas, as well as the geest and heaths inland. Also prominent are the low hills of the Baltic Uplands, the ground moraines, end moraines, sandur, glacial valleys, bogs and Luch.

These features were formed during the Weichselian glaciation and contrast topographically with the adjacent Central Uplands of Germany to the south, such as the Harz and Teutoburg Forest, which are occasionally counted as part of Northern Germany.

Culture
Northern Germany has traditionally been dominated by Protestantism, especially Lutheranism. The two northernmost provinces of Schleswig-Holstein and Lower Saxony have the largest percentage of self-reported Lutherans in Germany. Exceptions are the Catholic districts Emsland, Cloppenburg and Vechta in the west, traditionally linked to the Catholic region of Westphalia in the south, and the southernmost part of Lower Saxony, around the city Duderstadt, traditionally being part of the Catholic enclave region Eichsfeld.

Culturally and socially, Northern Germany is characterized by higher levels of income equality and gender equality than southern and south-western Germany. While the national federal Gini coefficient for Germany stands at around 30, the southern states have a Gini coefficient of 30.6 whereas for the Northern states the Gini coefficient stands at 27.5 which is closer to the Scandinavian average of 25. Traditional society in the western part of Northern Germany (Schleswig-Holstein, Lower Saxony and some parts of North Rhine-Westphalia and Saxony-Anhalt) until the early 20th century was based on well-off, literate and landowning yeoman farmers owning relatively large pieces of land, making a living growing grain crops and raising dairy cattle and pigs, and a large and educated middle class in the towns and cities working in the civil service, or as businessmen, artisans, blue-collar workers and skilled workers. Thus, the proportion of serfs, landless labourers, semi-skilled industrial workers and large landlords was relatively smaller, making for a more stable society than elsewhere in Germany like the Rhineland region and the region east of the Elbe river. Additionally, Northern cities like Hamburg, Bremen and Rostock have always been economic powerhouses of trade and commerce and have had a long tradition of innovation and creativity in business and industry.

Cuisine
The traditional Northern German daily diet is centered around boiled potatoes, rye bread, dairy products, cabbages, cucumbers, berries, jams, fish, and pork and beef. A breakfast specialty is the Crispbread or Knäckebrot, eaten with a variety of toppings such as ham, soft cheese, cucumber, tomatoes, and liver paste. Lentil stews and soups are very popular as a working lunch. Regional specialties in Schleswig-Holstein, Mecklenburg-Vorpommern and Lower Saxony include Blutwurst or Blood sausage and a variety of Blood puddings commonly eaten for brunch. Another Northern German regional specialty are Hackbraten, meatloaves, made from a mixture of ground pork and beef and served with mashed potatoes, brown sauce and lingonberry jam. Many traditional meat-based lunch dishes are served with boiled or mashed potatoes and brown sauce. Eating brunch is very popular during weekends in the larger towns and cities. In regions nearer to the coast, fish is very popular, with Pickled herring and salmon being delicacies.

Coffee drinking is strongly rooted in Northern Germany and the Northern provinces on average consume around 8 kilograms of coffee per capita annually. This is fairly more than the 6 kilograms of coffee per capita consumed in the south. Coffee is frequently drunk four times a day : with breakfast, after lunch, in the evening at around 4, and after dinner. Many working people also drink a coffee at the workstation with the start of the day's work, and/or a coffee break with colleagues around an hour before or after lunch. Besides, there is a strong tradition of taking coffee breaks and visits to the café with friends and acquaintances. In places like publicly funded Universities where free coffee is not available to students, it is not uncommon for students to bring their own hot coffee in insulated flasks and drink from it intermittently. Cafés usually offer medium-fat milk and sugar cubes along with filter coffee. Commonly eaten desserts include waffles with ice cream, pancakes, the sweet bun roll with cream known as Heißwecke, and Heidelbeerkuchen or blueberry pie with vanilla cream.

The northwesternmost region of East Frisia is an exception insofar as tea is largely preferred over coffee there, to the extent that East Frisians drink about 300 litres of tea per capita and year, more than in any particular country.

Lunch at workplaces and educational institutions in Northern Germany begins very early – usually between 11:45 am and 12:15 pm, and dinner is usually eaten between 7 and 8 in the evening. This is because the workday/schoolday starts pretty early at 8 am sharp. Lunches eaten at home during holidays and weekends usually start later – around 1 pm.

The drinking culture in the North is more or less similar to that of the rest of the country, heavily based on beer with Pale lagers and pilsners being favourites. Unlike Bavaria, Austria and Central Germany, dark beers or dark lagers are not at all popular in Northern Germany. The North has a slightly stronger tradition of hard liquor, such as Korn, vodka, and schnapps. Binge drinking is far more common in the North – almost 70% of binge drinking hospitalizations on weekends happen in the eight Northern provinces and states containing just 40% of the population. As in all of Germany, mulled wine is a popular alcoholic drink during the Christmas season.

History

In the Early Middle Ages, Northern Germany was the settlement area of the Saxon tribes, which were subjugated by the Frankish ruler Charlemagne in the Saxon Wars from 772 onwards, whereafter the Imperial Duchy of Saxony was established in 804. In the 10th century the Saxon lands, enlarged by the Saxon Eastern March, became the cradle of the Kingdom of Germany and the Holy Roman Empire, when the dukes of the Ottonian dynasty were elected King of the Romans and crowned Holy Roman Emperors.

From 1500 onwards, the former Saxon territories (except for Westphalia) were incorporated into the Lower Saxon Circle of the Holy Roman Empire. The Hanseatic League is also part of the common history and culture of the cities in northern Germany.

Northern Germany corresponds to the territory of the North German Confederation in the 19th century. The boundary between the spheres of political influence of Prussia (Northern Germany) and Austria (Southern Germany)  within the German Confederation (1815–1866) was known as the "Main line" (Mainlinie, after the river Main), Frankfurt am Main being the seat of the federal assembly. The "Main line" did not follow the course of the river Main upstream of Frankfurt, rather corresponding to the northern border of the Kingdom of Bavaria.

Cultural or political east–west divisions have existed in northern Germany since at least the early modern period, when

the easternmost and southeastern part (mainly East Prussia, Brandenburgian Pomerania, and Brandenburg) was owned by or part of the State of the Teutonic Order and later Brandenburg-Prussia,
the middle part (the island of Rügen, parts of Western Pomerania, eastern coastal regions of Schleswig-Holstein, and a fragmented Mecklenburg in the middle) during the Early Middle Ages was at least in parts inhabited by a large Slavic population (see Obotrites and Veleti) and for a long time from the High Middle Ages onwards was first under Danish (Principality of Rügen, 1168–1365), then Swedish influence as Swedish Pomerania (1628-1807/15),
and the Western part (today most of Schleswig-Holstein and all of Lower Saxony, including the Hanseatic city states and other towns in the region), sometimes known as Nordwestdeutschland and defined by the original homegrounds of the two tribes of the Frisians and Saxons, which would later comprise the Duchy of Saxony (est. 806), the Lower Rhenish–Westphalian Circle (1500), and the Lower Saxon Circle (1512). Nordwestdeutschland also more or less corresponds to the British Zone of Occupation in Allied-occupied Germany between 1945–49.

During the Cold War of the second half of the 20th century, a cultural division of northern Germany into an Eastern and a Western part has become more pronounced due to the 1949–1990 division of all of Germany into West Germany and East Germany, where identities based upon the former Iron Curtain and mutual prejudices regarding what once was the other side may still persist today.

Some Scottish and English Lutheranism Families went from 1683 - 1709 to Northern Germany, and settled there, so many Germans in Northwest Germany have Scottish and English roots

Northern German states
The term Northern German states is always used to refer to the following coastal federal States of Germany: 
Bremen
Hamburg
Mecklenburg-Vorpommern
Lower Saxony 
Schleswig-Holstein

In some cases, it also includes the non-coastal states of:
Brandenburg
Berlin
Saxony-Anhalt
North Rhine-Westphalia

Northern Germany as a region or as a historical landscape includes additional federal states (see geography above). Northwestern Germany is usually considered to be part of Northern Europe both culturally and geographically where as the southern states are much closer to Central European cultures.

Major cities
Where a city has different names in English and German, the English name is given first.

Sports

The German Football Association was founded in Leipzig in 1900. Several cities in Northern Germany have hosted matches of the 1974 FIFA World Cup, UEFA Euro 1988 and 2006 FIFA World Cup.

The Nordderby (Northern derby) is played between Hamburger SV and SV Werder Bremen, whereas the Hamburg derby is played between Hamburger SV and FC St. Pauli. Other notable men's football clubs include Hertha Berlin, VfL Wolfsburg, Hannover 96, Eintracht Braunschweig, F.C. Hansa Rostock, 1. FC Magdeburg. Hamburger SV won the 1982–83 European Cup and six German championships, whereas Werder Bremen won the German championship four times and Hertha Berlin twice.

In women's football, the VfL Wolfsburg won the Bundesliga three times and the UEFA Women's Champions League twice, whereas 1. FFC Turbine Potsdam won the Bundesliga six times and the UEFA Champions League twice.

Notable Basketball Bundesliga teams include Alba Berlin, Basketball Löwen Braunschweig, Hamburg Towers and EWE Baskets Oldenburg.

Notable Eishockey-Bundesliga teams include Eisbären Berlin, Grizzlys Wolfsburg, Hamburg Freezers, Hannover Scorpions and Fischtown Pinguins.

Notable handball teams include GWD Minden, SG Flensburg-Handewitt, TuS Nettelstedt-Lübbecke, THW Kiel, Handball Hamburg, SC Magdeburg, Buxtehuder SV, VfL Oldenburg and HSG Blomberg-Lippe.

Notable marathon races include the Berlin Marathon (one of the World Marathon Majors), Hamburg Marathon, Hannover Marathon.

Notable tennis tournaments include the Halle Open, International German Open and Sparkassen Open.

Other notable competitions are the Kiel Week, EuroEyes Cyclassics and the Hanse Sail.

The Olympiastadion in Berlin has hosted the 1936 Summer Olympics, 2009 IAAF World Championships in Athletics and Internationales Stadionfest.

The sailing competitions for the 1936 and 1972 Summer Olympics were held at the Bay of Kiel.

See also
Southern Germany
Western Germany
Central Germany (cultural area)

References

External links

Regions of Germany